Ervin Smajlagić (born 7 March 1976) is a Bosnian retired football player.

Playing career

International
Smajlagić made two senior appearances for Bosnia and Herzegovina, both (one unofficial) at the 2001 LG Cup where he played in the final against Iran.

Managerial career
He was dismissed as manager of Jedinstvo Bihać and replaced by Ahmet Kečalović in April 2014.

References

External links

Profile - NFSBIH

1976 births
Living people
Association football central defenders
Bosnia and Herzegovina footballers
Bosnia and Herzegovina international footballers
NK Jedinstvo Bihać players
HNK Hajduk Split players
HNK Cibalia players
FK Željezničar Sarajevo players
NK Croatia Sesvete players
HNK Orašje players
NK Hrvatski Dragovoljac players
FK Krajina Cazin players
Premier League of Bosnia and Herzegovina players
Croatian Football League players
First Football League (Croatia) players
First League of the Federation of Bosnia and Herzegovina players
Bosnia and Herzegovina expatriate footballers
Expatriate footballers in Croatia
Bosnia and Herzegovina expatriate sportspeople in Croatia
Bosnia and Herzegovina football managers
NK Jedinstvo Bihać managers